The 2011 Orbetello Challenger was a professional tennis tournament played on clay courts. It was the third edition of the tournament which was part of the 2011 ATP Challenger Tour. It took place in Orbetello, Italy between 18 and 24 July 2011.

ATP entrants

Seeds

 1 Rankings are as of July 11, 2011.

Other entrants
The following players received wildcards into the singles main draw:
  Marco Cecchinato
  Thiemo de Bakker
  Matteo Trevisan
  Filippo Volandri

The following players received entry from the qualifying draw:
  Maxime Authom
  Benjamin Balleret
  Iñigo Cervantes-Huegun
  Max Raditschnigg

The following players received entry as a lucky loser:
  Gerard Granollers

Champions

Singles

 Filippo Volandri def.  Matteo Viola, 4–6, 6–3, 6–2

Doubles

 Julian Knowle /  Igor Zelenay def.  Benoît Paire /  Romain Jouan, 6–1, 7–6(7–2)

External links
Official Website
ITF Search 
ATP official site

Orbetello Challenger
Clay court tennis tournaments
Orbetello Challenger